CLJ Records is a German independent record label formed in 2006 specializing in Japanese visual kei style rock and metal bands. The label currently has 31 bands signed. CLJ is a sub division of Colosseum Music Entertainment and their head office is located in Nuremberg Germany. In cooperation with the Japanese/German tour promotion company Rock Identity, most of the groups with material released under CLJ Records will also perform live on tour throughout Europe.

CLJ Records also released the compilation album J-Visual[ism] with JaME dedicated to the "next superstars" of Japanese rock, those bands are also among the listed artists under CLJ Records.

Bands whose music has been distributed by CLJ
9Goats Black Out
Alice Nine
Ap(r)il
Ayabie
Branch
DaizyStripper
Danger Gang
Deluhi
D=OUT
Kagrra
Kra
LiZ
Lynch
Matenrou Opera
Moran
NoGoD
-OZ-
Panic Channel
Plastic Tree
Pure Q&A
Screw
Saruin
SuG
Tarrot
Terashima Tamiya
the GazettE
Uchiike Hidekazu
UnsraW
Versailles
Vistlip
Wizard

See also
List of record labels
List of musical artists from Japan

External links
CLJ Records
Last.FM

References

CLJ Records Biography on Myspace
CLJ Records Artists List

German record labels